, known by the stage name , is a Japanese actor, voice actor, talent and sound director from Kikuchi, Kumamoto. He is affiliated with the talent management firm 81 Produce.

He is most known for the roles of Yoshihiro Kira from JoJo's Bizarre Adventure: Diamond Is Unbreakable, the narrator of Fist of the North Star, Megane from Urusei Yatsura, Rei Ichidō from High School! Kimengumi, Kazuma Kuwabara from YuYu Hakusho, Pilaf from Dragon Ball, Raditz and Garlic Jr. from Dragon Ball Z, Buggy the Clown from One Piece, Kefka Palazzo from Dissidia: Final Fantasy, and Kōichi Todome from Kerberos saga.

He was also the voice acting mentor to Megumi Hayashibara.

Career
Originally a stunt actor, Chiba also appeared in the Nikkatsu Roman Porno series of movies. He starred in the "Let's Make a Chiba Shigeru Promotion Film" project movie Kurenai no Gankyō, as well as the Mamoru Oshii films Cerberus, Hell's Watchdog and Talking Head. He plays both serious and gag roles.

Filmography

Anime

TV

Film
Urusei Yatsura series (1983-1991) (Megane)
Doraemon: Nobita's Great Adventure into the Underworld (1984) (Errand Demon)
High School! Kimengumi (1986) (Rei Ichidō)
Super Mario Bros.: The Great Mission to Rescue Princess Peach! (1986) (Kibidango)
Dragon Ball: Mystical Adventure (1988) (Pilaf)
Maison Ikkoku Kanketsuhen (1988) (Yotsuya, Soichiro-san (the dog))
My Neighbor Totoro (1988) (Kusakari-Otoko/ Mowing Man)
Dragon Ball Z: Dead Zone (1989) (Nicky)
Patlabor: The Movie (1989) (Shigeo Shiba)
Yu Yu Hakusho: The Movie (1993) (Kazuma Kuwabara)
Yu Yu Hakusho: Chapter of Underworld's Carnage - Bonds of Fire (1994) (Kazuma Kuwabara)
Patlabor 2: The Movie (1993) (Shigeo Shiba)
Ghost Sweeper Mikami (1994) (Doctor Chaos)
Ghost in the Shell (1995) (Janitor)
Mahojin Guru Guru (1996) (Hatton)
Metropolis (2001) (Acetylene Lamp)
Konjiki no Gash Bell!!: 101-Banme no Mamono (2004) (Mop Demon)
Konjiki no Gash Bell!! Movie 2: Attack of the Mecha-Vulcan (2005) (Dr. M2)
Doraemon: Nobita's Secret Gadget Museum (2013) (Dr. Pepura)
Dragon Ball Z: Battle of Gods (2013) (Pilaf)
Space Battleship Yamato 2199: Odyssey of the Celestial Ark (2014) (Dr. Sakezō Sado)
Dragon Ball Z: Resurrection 'F' (2015) (Pilaf)

Video games

Live action
Nikkatsu Roman Porno (1971-1988?)
Shiroi Kyotō (TV drama in 1978)
The Red Spectacles (1987) (Kōichi Todome)
StrayDog: Kerberos Panzer Cops (1991) (Kōichi Todome)
Talking Head (1992) (I)
Sakigake!! Otokojuku Live-action film (2007) (Narration (Minmei Publishing)/Voice on loud speaker)
The Next Generation -Patlabor- (2014–15) (Shigeo Shiba)
Kurenai no Gankyō

Tokusatsu
Mirrorman (Invader) (1971-1972)
Dinosaur Corps Koseidon (Research Worker of the Time-Space Administration Bureau (Actor))
Mysterious girl Nile Thutmose (Geek Demon) (1978-1979)
X-Bomber (Bongo Heracles) (1980-1981)
Singing Great Ryūgū-jō (Bad Noodles) (1992)
Gosei Sentai Dairanger (Kabuki Novice (ep. 13 - 14)) (1993)
Yūgen Jikkō Three Sisters Shushutorian (Vending Machine) (ep. 21)) (1993)
Ninja Sentai Kakuranger (Chōchinkozō (ep. 41)) (1994)
Juukou B-Fighter (Schwartz) (1995-1996)
B-Robo Kabutack (Sharkler) (1997-1998)
Kaizoku Sentai Gokaiger (Sneak Brother Elder (ep. 8)) (2011)
Kamen Rider × Super Sentai × Space Sheriff: Super Hero Taisen Z (Kyoryuger Equipment) (2013)
Zyuden Sentai Kyoryuger: Gaburincho of Music (Narration, voice of Kyoryuger Equipment) (2013)
Zyuden Sentai Kyoryuger (Dr. Ulshade (Actor)/Kyoryu Violet (Voice), Narration, Kyoryuger Equipment) (2013-2014)
Zyuden Sentai Kyoryuger vs. Go-Busters: The Great Dinosaur Battle! Farewell Our Eternal Friends (Kyoryuger Equipment) (2014)
Ultraman X (Hayato's Father) (2015-2016)

Radio
Hamidashi Kanezawa Ōkoku
Ōji Hiroi no Multi Tengoku

Dubbing

Live-action

Other
Star Tours (Dak Ralter) (1987)
The Amazing Adventures of Spider-Man the Ride (Hob Goblin) (1999)
Magic Lamp Theater (Bekiet) (2001)
SD Gundam Gashapon Wars (Narration (commercial)) (2005)

CD
Inferious Wakusei Senshi Gaiden Condition Green (Jasu Tamigan) (1990) 
Roman Club (Udo Ayanokōji) (1996)
Yūkyū Gensōkyoku 2nd Album Drama CD: ensemble vol.1 (Marshall) (1998)
Aria (Old Postal Worker) (2005-2006)
Setō no Hanayome (Izumi) (2007)
Strange+ (Narrator, α) (2008)

Live Theatre
Sakura Taisen Kayō Show: Shin-pen Hakkenden (2002)
Burstman Live (performer, producer)

Other work
Tensai TV-kun: Mystery no Yakata (Count Brain Buster) (1993-1997)
Tensai TV-kun:Tensai TV-kun Wide (TK-kun) (1999)
Okā-san to Issho (Spoo and Gatarat) (Gatarat) (1999-2000)
Tensai TV-kun MAX: Mystery no Yakata (Miracle Man) (2006-2007, 2010)

Sound effects director

Anime television
Delightful Moomin Family: Adventure Diary (1991)
Kuma no Pūtarō (1995)
Haunted Junction (1997)
Yoiko (1998)
Hoshin Engi (1999)
Sister Princess (2001)
Tantei Shounen Kageman (2001)
Sister Princess: RePure (2002)
Grandpa Danger (2004)
Kirarin Revolution (2006)

Anime OVA
Devilman Tanjōhen (1987)
Gosenzo-sama Banbanzai! (1989)
Go Nagai World (1991)
Kyūkyoku Chōjin R (1991)
Twin Signal (1995)
Tattoon Master (1996)
Amazing Nurse Nanako (1999)
Memories Off (2001)
Bizarre Cage (2003)
Memories Off 2nd (2003)
Guardian Hearts (2003)
Memories Off 3.5 (2004)
Guardian Hearts Power Up! (2005)

Video games
Blue Breaker: Ken yori mo Bishō wo (PC-FX) (1997)

Live action movies
Talking Head - Rei Maruwa (1992)

References

External links
Chiba Shigeru at 81 Produce 
Shigeru Chiba at GamePlaza-Haruka Voice Acting Database 
Shigeru Chiba at Hitoshi Doi's Seiyuu Database

1954 births
Living people
Japanese male stage actors
Japanese male video game actors
Japanese male voice actors
Male voice actors from Kumamoto Prefecture
Japanese voice directors
81 Produce voice actors
20th-century Japanese male actors
21st-century Japanese male actors